"Escape to L.A." is the fourth episode of Torchwood: Miracle Day, the fourth series of the British science fiction television series Torchwood. It was originally broadcast in the United States on Starz on 29 July 2011, in Australia on UKTV on 30 July 2011, in Canada on Space on 30 July 2011, and in the United Kingdom on BBC One on 4 August 2011.

Torchwood: Miracle Day follows the aftermath of a day where humanity has stopped being able to die. In the episode, a team called Torchwood raid the Los Angeles headquarters of a pharmaceutical company that appeared to have foreknowledge of "Miracle Day" to steal information kept on the servers.

Plot
 
Esther visits her sister, Sarah Drummond. She sees the house boarded up and tells Sarah why she's going to stop the miracle. She asks to see Alice and Melony Drummond before she goes. Sarah refuses because of her mental condition, thinking the miracle a poison, and shuts the door. In her car, Esther phones Social Services and reports the two girls are in danger, but refuses to give her name. She drives off. A man in a black car with the strange GPS triangle icon reports ESTHER DRUMMOND LOCATED. A voice orders him to follow Esther to lead him to Torchwood.

The team arrive in California and rent a shack to plan the assault. A woman gives Rex a Dead is Dead campaign flyer. Rex phones Dr. Vera Juarez. She tells him it's a campaign run by Ellis Hartley Monroe. Gwen gets a call from Rhys and asks about her father and daughter. Rhys says they are fine and jokes about why she is in Los Angeles. As Gwen talks, the man stalking them takes photos of her.

During a conversation with Rex, Esther reveals that he has family in California, but Rex denies all knowledge. Later on, he sneaks out to visit his father, who resents his presence and threatens him with a shotgun, claiming that Rex hadn't cared about him for fifteen years.

The team begin plans for a raid on PhiCorp in order to steal server hard drives, where Esther reveals they have a bio-metric security system.  In order to bypass it they need a voice recording, a palm print and a retina scan from a man called Nickolas Frumpkin. To obtain this, Jack and Gwen pretend they are an American couple and approach Nicholas Frumpkin, his wife and his baby. Jack uses the alias John Smith when he introduces himself to them. Using a great deal of skill, (recording him saying his name, taking fingerprints from a flask Gwen makes him hold and getting a picture of his eyes) they are able to begin the raid on PhiCorp.

Meanwhile, the hit man finds Nickolas Frumpkin, recording his voice, then cutting off the palm of his hands and removing one of his eyes. Gwen is able to get into the building with help from Esther hacking the phone system.  Jack supposedly delivers a package to PhiCorp, but inside is an exact copy of the PhiCorp server, only designed to look like it suffered fire damage.

Activating the fire alarm, Jack and Gwen are able to remove the hard drives. However, when Jack leaves to get them out of the building, Gwen is ambushed by the hit man. When Jack finds one of the delivery staff hung yet still alive, he rushes back to help Gwen and finds her bound hand and foot and gagged with plastic wires, but he too is knocked out and tied up with plastic wires. Rex rushes in to save them, climbing 66 flights of stairs and suffering heavy bleeding.

The hit man reveals he knows Jack is mortal, and wants to guarantee a place in a "New World Order" by bringing him to "Them". He plans to slit the throat of the now un-gagged Gwen, who almost tricks him into revealing who he works for, but Rex bursts in and shoots the man several times, destroying his throat. Later on, they search the hard drives and learn about "Overflow Camps". However, Rhys calls Gwen to tell her that her father is being sent to one of these camps as well and by the time Gwen tells him to stop them, her father has already been taken away.
 
Dr. Vera Juarez and several doctors visit an abandoned hospital that is being used to handle the extra surplus of patients but much to Vera's frustration, the plan is a failure as there are too many patients admitted to the hospital and they don't have enough equipment to handle them. Meanwhile, Ellis Hartley Monroe, a mayor and member of the Tea Party, starts a campaign called "Dead is Dead", which aims to segregate the undying from the public until death finally comes for them. Oswald, Jilly and PhiCorp do not like this since her popularity might derail Oswald's and threaten PhiCorp's plans. When Ellis makes a speech near the hospital where the extra patients are being sent, Oswald makes a bold move by entering the hospital and meeting the patients there, thus making the press immediately focus on him. Inside, Oswald tells the patients that they all deserve equal medical treatment and that people like Ellis are trying to take their rights away from them as they don't consider them human anymore. He promises to fight on their behalf and instantly the patients, the press and the public call Oswald a hero, much to Ellis's frustration. The secret organization that controls PhiCorp drugs Ellis and when she comes to she is tied up and gagged in her car. She is in a car compactor, where they tell her "The Families" will eliminate anyone who poses a threat to them before her car is crushed in the compactor, trapping Ellis inside.

Reception

Den of Geek gave the episode a positive review saying "Come the end of Escape To L.A., it feels as if most of Miracle Day’s key themes are now firmly established, even if the detail is yet to come. And the episode is an interesting one. It doesn’t have the lovely smaller moments that really set Dead of Night apart, and we still think that episode three is the peak of the series to date. But, episode four? It's still strong, and it's still worth tuning in to see."

References

External links

    
2011 British television episodes
Torchwood episodes